Bakhytzhan Zhumagulov (Baqytjan Tūrsynūly Jūmağūlov; born 18 August 1953) is a Kazakh politician who was Chairman of Otan and after renamed Nur Otan, the largest political party in Kazakhstan. and acting chairman of Nur Otan party, created by merging a number of other parties into Otan.

Zhumagulov told reporters in a news conference in Astana on 25 September 2006 that Otan and Asar political parties officially merged. "In all, the merged Otan party has a membership of 700,000, which makes it the country's largest political party."

Since 4 July 2007, Nur Otan has been headed by President Nursultan Nazarbayev.

From 2010 to 2013, he held the post of Minister of Education and Science.

References

External links
Kazakhstan: Ruling Party Gets Even Bigger

Living people
Fatherland (Kazakhstan) politicians
Government ministers of Kazakhstan
Nur Otan politicians
Al-Farabi Kazakh National University alumni
1953 births